Jai Jai Swami Samarth is a Marathi mythological TV series which airing on Colors Marathi. It premiered on 28 December 2020. It is directed by Umesh Namjoshi and written by Shirish Latkar under the banner of CamsKlub Studios. Akshay Mudwadkar plays the role of Swami Samarth.

Synopsis 
It is story of Swami Samarth who was an Indian spiritual master of Dattatreya tradition. Widely known for his spirituality in Maharashtra, he lived during the 19th century.

Cast 
 Akshay Mudwadkar as Swami Samarth
 Vijaya Babar as Chanda
 Kritina Vartak as Saraja (Chanda's step sister)
 Pooja Raibagi as Kalindi (Chanda's stepmother)
 Atul Sanas as Chanda's father
 Akshata Sawant as Yesu (Cholappa's wife)
 Nitya Pawar as Krishnappa
 Satish Salagare as Pant
 Swanand Desai as Bandopa/Bandopant
 Neeta Pendse as Radha (Yesu's mother)

Music 
The lyrics is written by Vaibhav Joshi and music given by Shashank Pawar and sung by Ashta Lohar.

References

External links
 
 Jai Jai Swami Samarth at Voot

Marathi-language television shows
Colors Marathi original programming
2020 Indian television series debuts
Indian television series about Hindu deities